The Bahraini King's Cup is a cup competition involving teams from the Bahraini Premier League and 2nd tier. Al-Muharraq SC are the current holders of the King's Cup, having defeated their arch-rivals Riffa S.C. 3-1 in last year's final. They have won four of the past five editions of the tournament, with Riffa claiming the crown in between in 2010.

Draw
The official draw took place on 7 February 2013.

The results of the draw were: 
Current champions Muharraq face Al Shabab.
Al-Najma take on Hidd SCC.
Al Ahli club face Al Ittihad.
Busaiteen Club play against Al Tadamun Buri, who beat Qalali to enter the tournament.
Malkiya Club face the Bahrain Club.
Al Hala take on East Riffa Club.
Manama Club play against Budaiya Club
Rffa Club take on Isa Town Club.

Organisation
The opening phases of the cup took place on 22 and 26 February 2013. The quarter-finals took place on March 26 and 27, followed by the semi-finals on April 14. The final took place on April 18, with the king, Hamad bin Isa Al-Khalifa attending the match.

Preliminary round
The winners of the preliminary round qualify for the last 16 elimination round of the tournament.

Round one

Quarter-finals

Semi-finals

Final

References

Bahraini King's Cup seasons
King's Cup
Bahrain